The 2nd Richmond Trophy was a non-championship Formula One race held at Goodwood Circuit, West Sussex, England. It was a short race of only 11 laps and was won by Reg Parnell in a Maserati 4CLT/48. Parnell also set fastest lap.

Classification 

1Grid places drawn by ballot

References
 Results at Silhouet.com 
 Results at ChicaneF1.com 

Richmond
Glover Trophy
20th century in West Sussex
Richmond Trophy
Richmond Trophy